Steven de Waard and Ben McLachlan were the defending champions but chose not to defend their title.

Filippo Baldi and Andrea Pellegrino won the title after defeating Pedro Martínez and Mark Vervoort 4–6, 6–3, [10–5] in the final.

Seeds

Draw

References
 Main Draw

Internazionali di Tennis Città dell'Aquila - Doubles
2018 Doubles